Sotades of Crete was an ancient Olympic runner.

Career
Winner in the long distance race, the dolichos of 384 BC. 

Afterwards Sotades was bribed by the Ephesians to be proclaimed as a citizen of Ephesos (Ephesus) and was subsequently exiled by the Cretans. 

Sotades competed again as a citizen of Ephesus in 380 BC.

References
Pausanias 6.18.6; A 227
Sport and spectacle in the ancient world by Donald G. Kyle. Page 131. 

Ancient Greek runners
Ancient Cretan athletes
Ancient Olympic competitors